Major-General Nicholas John Caplin CB (born 4 December 1958) is a retired British Army officer who commanded United Kingdom Support Command (Germany).

Military career
Educated at Poole Grammar School and the University of Surrey (BSc Economics), Caplin was commissioned into the Army Air Corps, joining 661 Squadron AAC in 1980. As a junior officer he served in Northern Ireland.

Promoted to lieutenant colonel, he became a member of the directing staff at the Staff College, Camberley in 1995 and commanding officer of 3 Regiment Army Air Corps at Wattisham in 1997, at which time his regiment was involved in operations in Bosnia and Herzegovina. He became deputy commander and chief of staff of the Joint Helicopter Force (Northern Ireland) in January 2000, Commandant of the School of Army Aviation in Middle Wallop in Spring 2001 and, following promotion to brigadier, he became deputy commander 
and chief of staff of the Joint Helicopter Command in January 2003. He went on to be commander of Collective Training Group in January 2006, Kosovo Protection Corps co-ordinator in March 2008 and general officer commanding United Kingdom Support Command (Germany) in August 2009. He became chief army instructor at the Royal College of Defence Studies in October 2012.

In July 2014, it was announced that Caplin had been appointed chief executive of Blind Veterans UK, the charity for blind and vision-impaired ex-Service men and women, with effect from October 2014.

References

1958 births
Living people
People educated at Poole Grammar School
Alumni of the University of Surrey
British Army major generals
Companions of the Order of the Bath
British Army Air Corps officers